Hamish is an Australian band made up of singer Hamish Cowan (Cordrazine) and producer Bryan St James. Their single "Life Song" reached the top 100 on Australia's ARIA singles chart.

They released their debut album, Homesick, in 2002 to mixed reviews. Writing in the Sunday Herald Sun Graeme Hammond called it "a record of exquisite harmony and balance". Emma Chalmers of the Courier Mail gave it 3 stars calling it "a quite delicate album that beautifully combines emotional melody with techno beats". The Herald Sun's Peter Holmes gave it 7/10 writing "At times the wispy electronic arrangements sit perfectly, yet elsewhere they lack the required drama." Annika Priest of Perth's Sunday Times called it "Slightly morbid, often wishy-washy".

Members
Hamish Cowan (vocals)
Bryan St James (keyboards)

Discography

Singles

References 

Australian musical groups
Living people
Year of birth missing (living people)